The Garita Creek Formation is a geologic formation in New Mexico that contains vertebrate fossils characteristic of the Carnian Age of the late Triassic . 

The formation may be synonymous with the Tecovas Formation in Texas.

Description
The formation consists mostly of gray red to red or mottled gray green mudstone containing limestone nodules. About 25% of the formation is massive fine-grained laminar gray red sandstone. It rests conformably on the Santa Rosa Formation, and is overlain disconformably by the Trujillo Formation. It is exposed throughout the drainage of the Conchas River and its tributaries west to the Sangre de Cristo Mountains.

Fossils
The formation contains vertebrate fossils of Desmatosuchus, Typothorax, Paratypothorax, Postosuchus, rauisuchians, metoposaurids, Ceratodus, and indeterminate phytosaurs.

History of investigation
The formation was first named by Lucas and Hunt in 1989 for beds formerly assigned to the informal lower shale member of the Chinle Formation in the Tucumcari Basin. The formation definition has been criticized as a junior synonym for the Tecovas Formation across the border in Texas.

See also

 List of dinosaur-bearing rock formations
 List of stratigraphic units with indeterminate dinosaur fossils

Footnotes

References
 
 
 

Triassic formations of New Mexico